Richard Anderson is an American concept artist, illustrator, and painter. He won the Gold Spectrum Award in 2011, the Art Directors Guild Award for Excellence in Production Design for a Fantasy Film in 2015, and he was the final person to win the Gemmell Award for Best Fantasy Cover Art.

He has created artwork used on dozens of book covers, concept art used in the production of several films, and has worked both freelance and for specific companies in his career.

Biography
Richard Anderson is a native of Montana, where he lived in a trailer house. He began drawing when he was young, and had difficulty in school. After graduating high school, he began attending The Art Institute of Seattle, where he graduated after focusing on his drawing.

In 2003, he began working as an artist at NCSoft (specifically at ArenaNet), where he worked on the Guild Wars games. After working at NCSoft for eight-and-a-half years, he moved to MPC, where he worked through 2011. He won the 2011 Gold Spectrum Award in the Institutional category for Knight March, and he has since been included multiple times in Spectrum. He then worked at Framestore until October 2013, after which he began working for Rocksteady Studios.

He was nominated for the 2014 BSFA Award for Best Artwork for The Mirror Empire. Along with other members of the art department, he won the Art Directors Guild Award for Excellence in Production Design for a Fantasy Film in 2015 for his work as a senior concept artist on the film Guardians of the Galaxy.

Anderson was nominated in 2016 for the Chesley Award for Best Cover Illustration – Hardcover for The Dinosaur Lords. That same year, Anderson was also nominated for the World Fantasy Award for Best Artist. In 2018, he was the final person to win the Gemmell Award for Best Fantasy Cover Art for Kings of the Wyld.

He also does freelance work through is studio, Flaptraps Art. He uses standard sketches on paper for some projects, but he also uses a Cintiq tablet so he can work directly in Photoshop from the beginning. He also uses 3D tools like SketchUp, Maya, 3ds Max, and modo in his visualization work.

Works

Cover art
Anderson created the cover art for the following:
A Grey Moon Over China by Thomas A. Day (March 2010, Tor Books)
Ghosts of Ascalon by Matt Forbeck and Jeff Grubb (August 2010, Pocket Star Books)
The Iron Shirts by Michael F. Flynn (April 2011, Tor.com)
Ragnarok by Paul Park (May 2011, Tor.com)
Seven Princes by John R. Fultz (January 2012, Orbit Books)
Among the Silvering Herd by A. M. Dellamonica (February 2012, Tor.com)
The Scar by Marina Dyachenko and Sergey Dyachenko (February 2012, Tor Books)
Spin the Sky by Katy Stauber (June 2012, Night Shade Books)
Faster Gun by Elizabeth Bear (August 2012, Tor.com)
Seven Kings by John R. Fultz (January 2013, Orbit Books)
Last Train to Jubilee Bay by Kali Wallace (February 2013, Tor.com)
Terrain by Genevieve Valentine (March 2013, Tor.com)
Seven Sorcerers by John R. Fultz (December 2013, Orbit Books)
Subterranean Magazine, Winter 2014 cover (December 2013, Subterranean Press)
The Anderson Project edited by David G. Hartwell (January 2014, Tor.com)
The Cartography of Sudden Death by Charlie Jane Anders (January 2014, Tor.com)
The Emperor's Blades by Brian Staveley (January 2014, Tor Books)
The Ugly Woman of Castello di Putti by A. M. Dellamonica (April 2014, Tor.com)
The Colonel by Peter Watts (July 2014, Tor.com)
Echopraxia by Peter Watts (August 2014, Tor Books)
The Mirror Empire by Kameron Hurley (August 2014, Angry Robot)
The Providence of Fire by Brian Staveley (January 2015, Tor Books)
When the Heavens Fall by Marc Turner (May 2015, Tor Books)
The Sea of Trolls by Nancy Farmer (June 2015, Saga Press)
The Dinosaur Lords by Victor Milán (July 2015, Tor Books)
The Land of the Silver Apples by Nancy Farmer (July 2015, Saga Press)
Time Salvager by Wesley Chu (July 2015, Tor Books)
The Islands of the Blessed by Nancy Farmer (August 2015, Saga Press)
Sunset Mantle by Alter S. Reiss (September 2015, Tor.com)
Empire Ascendant by Kameron Hurley (October 2015, Angry Robot)
The Builders by Daniel Polansky (November 2015, Tor.com)
The Glass Galago by A. M. Dellamonica (January 2016, Tor.com)
The Grimm Future edited by Erin Underwood (February 2016, NESFA Press)
The Last Mortal Bond by Brian Staveley (March 2016, Tor Books)
The Dinosaur Knights by Victor Milán (July 2016, Tor Books)
Time Siege by Wesley Chu (July 2016, Angry Robot)
The Forgetting Moon by Brian Lee Durfee (August 2016, Saga Press)
Red Tide by Marc Turner (September 2016, Tor Books)
The Burning Light by Bradley P. Beaulieu and Rob Ziegler (November 2016, Tor.com)
Kings of the Wyld by Nicholas Eames (February 2017, Orbit Books)
Losing Heart Among the Tall by A. M. Dellamonica (February 2017, Tor.com)
Skullsworn by Brian Staveley (April 2017, Tor Books)
River of Teeth by Sarah Gailey (May 2017, Tor.com)
The Dinosaur Princess by Victor Milán (August 2017, Tor Books)
Taste of Marrow by Sarah Gailey (September 2017, Tor.com)
The Stone in the Skull by Elizabeth Bear (October 2017, Tor Books)
Bloody Rose by Nicholas Eames (August 2018, Orbit Books)
War Cry by Brian McClellan (August 2018, Tor.com)
The Gutter Prayer by Gareth Hanrahan (January 2019, Orbit Books)
Ship of Smoke and Steel by Django Wexler (January 2019, Tor Teen)
The Blackest Heart by Brian Lee Durfee (February 2019, Saga Press)
The Red-Stained Wings by Elizabeth Bear (May 2010, Tor Books)
Dragonslayer by Duncan M. Hamilton (July 2019, Tor Books)
The Black Hawks by David Wragg (October 2019, Harper Voyager)
The Menace from Farside by Ian McDonald (November 2019, Tor.com)
Knight of the Silver Circle by Duncan M. Hamilton (November 2019, Tor Books)
The Broken Heavens by Kameron Hurley (January 2020, Angry Robot)
City of Stone and Silence by Django Wexler (January 2020, Tor Teen)
The Shadow Saint by Gareth Hanrahan (January 2020, Orbit Books)
Servant of the Crown by Duncan M. Hamilton (March 2020, Tor Books)

Films
Anderson worked as a concept artist on the following films:
Prometheus (2012)
Thor: The Dark World (2013)
World War Z (2013)
Edge of Tomorrow (2014)
Guardians of the Galaxy (2014)
Transformers: The Last Knight (2017)
Captain Marvel (2019)

He worked as a digital artist on The Kid Who Would Be King in 2019.

Reception
Anderson's work has been described as "explosive, [with] energy to every line", "raw, colourful" and "tense and mature...". Sarah Gailey, the author of River of Teeth, stated "[h]is covers are dynamic and gorgeous...[rendering] a world in broad, luminous strokes."

Awards and honors

References

External links

Richard Anderson at Internet Speculative Fiction Database

Living people
21st-century American male artists
American conceptual artists
Fantasy artists
American male painters
American production designers
Role-playing game artists
Science fiction artists
Sports artists
Video game artists
Year of birth missing (living people)